Mohammad Izhar bin Ahmad is a Malaysian politician who served as Member of the Johor State Executive Council (EXCO) in the Barisan Nasional (BN) state administration under Menteri Besar Hasni Mohammad from March 2020 to March 2022 and Member of the Johor State Legislative Assembly (MLA) for Larkin from May 2018 to March 2022. He is a member of the United Malays National Organisation (UMNO), a component party of the Barisan Nasional (BN) coalition after leaving the Malaysian United Indigenous Party (BERSATU), a component party of the ruling Perikatan Nasional (PN) coalition on 29 January 2022. 

On 29 January 2022, Izhar announced that he had resigned from BERSATU citing a loss of confidence in party president Muhyiddin Yassin and would not seek for reelection as a Johor MLA for in the 2022 Johor state election and throwing his support behind BN. He is the second Johor MLA from BERSATU and PN to do so after Puteri Wangsa MLA Mazlan Bujang.

Election Results

References 

Year of birth missing (living people)
Living people
People from Johor
Malaysian people of Malay descent
Malaysian Muslims
United Malays National Organisation politicians
Independent politicians in Malaysia
Former Malaysian United Indigenous Party politicians
Members of the Johor State Legislative Assembly
Johor state executive councillors
21st-century Malaysian politicians